George Savile or Saville may refer to:

Sir George Savile, 1st Baronet (1551–1622), MP for Yorkshire and Boroughbridge
George Savile (c. 1583 – 1614), MP for Morpeth (UK Parliament constituency) and Appleby
Sir George Savile, 7th Baronet (1679–1743), English politician
Sir George Savile, 8th Baronet (1726–1784), English politician
George Savile, 1st Marquess of Halifax (1633–1695), English statesman, writer, and politician
George Savile (cricketer) (1847–1904), cricketer 
George Saville (born 1993), a professional footballer, playing for Middlesbrough and Northern Ireland

See also